Māngere or Mangere  is one of the largest suburbs in Auckland, in northern New Zealand. It is located on mainly flat land on the northeastern shore of the Manukau Harbour, to the northwest of Manukau City Centre and 15 kilometres south of the Auckland city centre. It is the location of Auckland Airport, which lies close to the harbour's edge to the south of the suburb.

Māngere has three major sub-areas: Māngere Bridge, Māngere Central, and Māngere East, with Favona (in the east) sometimes counted as part of Māngere as well.

The suburb is named after Māngere Mountain, one of Auckland's largest volcanic cones. The cone's name comes from the Māori phrase hau māngere, meaning "lazy winds", after the shelter the mountain provides from the prevailing westerly wind. In 2019, the name of the suburb was officially gazetted as Māngere.

Demographics

Māngere had a population of 21,363 at the 2018 New Zealand census, an increase of 2,067 people (10.7%) since the 2013 census, and an increase of 2,613 people (13.9%) since the 2006 census. There were 4,317 households, comprising 10,407 males and 10,950 females, giving a sex ratio of 0.95 males per female, with 5,997 people (28.1%) aged under 15 years, 5,703 (26.7%) aged 15 to 29, 8,010 (37.5%) aged 30 to 64, and 1,650 (7.7%) aged 65 or older.

Ethnicities were 11.6% European/Pākehā, 16.1% Māori, 68.1% Pacific peoples, 17.5% Asian, and 1.0% other ethnicities. People may identify with more than one ethnicity.

The percentage of people born overseas was 39.7, compared with 27.1% nationally.

Although some people chose not to answer the census's question about religious affiliation, 14.4% had no religion, 64.7% were Christian, 2.3% had Māori religious beliefs, 4.9% were Hindu, 7.7% were Muslim, 0.7% were Buddhist and 0.7% had other religions.

Of those at least 15 years old, 1,452 (9.4%) people had a bachelor's or higher degree, and 3,582 (23.3%) people had no formal qualifications. 939 people (6.1%) earned over $70,000 compared to 17.2% nationally. The employment status of those at least 15 was that 7,236 (47.1%) people were employed full-time, 1,647 (10.7%) were part-time, and 975 (6.3%) were unemployed.

Society 

Māngere is often described as a very multicultural area, with Europeans, Māori, Pacific Islanders and Asians living in the area, often with large families. Houses are a mixture of villas and bungalows, often located on former farms or market gardens developed by the state in the 1940s to 1960s.

Māngere's most famous son is David Lange, who was the Member of Parliament for Māngere from 1977 until 1996 and Prime Minister of New Zealand. Another local personality is former heavyweight boxing champion David Tua.

William Sio of the New Zealand Labour Party has been the member of Parliament for the Māngere electorate since 2008.

Marae

Māngere has three marae:

 Makaurau Marae and its Tāmaki Makaurau meeting house are affiliated with the Waikato Tainui hapū of Ngāti Paretaua, Te Ākitai and Ngāti Te Ata.
 Pūkaki Marae and Te Kāhu Pokere o Tāmaki Mākaurau meeting house are affiliated with the hapū of Ngāti Pare Waiohua from Te Ākitai Waiohua, and the hapū of Te Ākitai, Ngāti Te Ata and Ngāti Paretaua from Waikato Tainui.
 Mātaatua Marae and its Awanuiarangi meeting house are affiliated with the Ngāti Awa hapū of Ngāti Awa ki Tāmaki Makaurau.

Transport 

The original Māngere Bridge was built to link Mangere with Onehunga to its north while the isthmus of Auckland reaches its narrowest point, further to the east at Ōtāhuhu. Later, it provided a more direct route for traffic to and from Auckland Airport. Construction of a new bridge was the subject of one of New Zealand's longest-running industrial disputes, from 1978 until 1980. The bridge was finally completed in 1983. The Southwestern Motorway (State Highway 20), one of the two motorways running south from the isthmus, runs across the bridge and through Māngere.

Passenger train Southern and Eastern Line services run along the eastern edge of Māngere, stopping at Middlemore railway station. Further north at Massey Road is Māngere railway station, closed in 2011.

Frequent bus services (15 mins schedules) connect Māngere Town Centre to Sylvia Park via Otahuhu railway station (route 32) and to Botany Town Centre via Papatoetoe railway station and Ōtara (route 31). Connections can be made with Onehunga, Auckland Airport and Manukau Bus Station on (route 380) Note: The 313 runs on a more direct route between Onehunga, Māngere, Papatoetoe and Manukau but services are at 30 min frequencies.

Education
Māngere College is a secondary school  (years 9–13) with a roll of  students.

Sir Douglas Bader Intermediate School is an intermediate school  (years 7–8) with a roll of  students.

 
Te Kura Kaupapa Māori o Māngere is a Māori-language area school (years 1–13) with a roll of  students.

They are state-integrated Islamic schools on adjacent sites.

All these schools except for Zayed College are coeducational. Rolls are as of

Sport and recreation
The Māngere Arts Centre Ngā Tohu o Uenuku is an Auckland Council owned and operated performing arts venue and gallery space.

The Mangere East Hawks rugby league club is based in Māngere at the Walter Massey Park.

The Manukau Rovers RFC rugby union club is also based in Māngere and competes in the Auckland Premier Competition.

The Mangere United football club is also based in Māngere and competes in the Auckland Football and NZ Football National League Competitions.

Notable buildings 

 St James' Church (Anglican
Selwyn Church, Māngere East

Notable people
Valerie Adams – Olympic shot put champion
Frank Bunce – rugby union
Mark Hunt – mixed martial artist
David Lange – former Prime Minister
Jonah Lomu – rugby union
Colin Moyle – politician
Joseph Parker – boxer
Pene and Amitai Pati – tenors Sol3 Mio
Jason Taumalolo – rugby league
David Tua – heavyweight boxer
Roger Tuivasa-Sheck – rugby league
Kween Kong – Drag superstar, house mother and cabaret artist

References

External links

Photographs of Mangere held in Auckland Libraries' heritage collections. 

Suburbs of Auckland
Māngere-Ōtāhuhu Local Board Area
Populated places around the Manukau Harbour